The 1983 Furman Paladins football team was an American football team that represented Furman University as a member of the Southern Conference (SoCon) during the 1983 NCAA Division I-AA football season. In their sixth year under head coach Dick Sheridan, the Paladins compiled an overall record of 10–2–1 with a conference mark of 6–0–1, winning the SoCon title for the fourth consecutive season.

Schedule

References

Furman
Furman Paladins football seasons
Southern Conference football champion seasons
Furman Paladins football